Hans-Ulrich Sckerl (28 April 1951 – 14 February 2022) was a German politician. A member of Alliance 90/The Greens, he served in the Landtag of Baden-Württemberg from 2006 to 2022. He died on 14 February 2022, at the age of 70.

References

1951 births
2022 deaths
Alliance 90/The Greens politicians
Members of the Landtag of Baden-Württemberg
21st-century German politicians
People from Weinheim